The 1990–91 New Orleans Privateers men's basketball team represented the University of New Orleans during the 1990–91 NCAA Division I men's basketball season. The Privateers led by third-year head coach Tim Floyd, played their home games at Lakefront Arena and played as a member of the American South Conference. They finished the season 23–8 (9–3 ASC) and tied for the regular season conference title with Arkansas State. New Orleans lost in championship game of the American South Conference tournament, but earned a bid to the NCAA tournament as the No. 14 seed in the Southeast region. The Privateers would lose in the opening round to eventual National Runner-up Kansas, 55–49.

Roster

Schedule and results

|-
!colspan=9 style=| Regular season

|-
!colspan=9 style=| American South Conference tournament

|-
!colspan=9 style=| NCAA tournament

Rankings

Awards and honors
Tank Collins – American South Men's Player of the Year

References

New Orleans Privateers men's basketball seasons
New Orleans
New Orleans
1990 in sports in Louisiana
1991 in sports in Louisiana